Four ships of the Imperial Russian Navy, Soviet Navy and Russian Navy have been named after Admiral Mikhail Petrovich Lazarev.

  – the lead ship of her class of monitor
  – an  light cruiser subsequently named Krasnyi Kavkaz
  – a 
  – a  missile cruiser originally named Frunze

Russian Navy ship names